The 1963 Paris–Roubaix was the 61st edition of the Paris–Roubaix cycle race and was held on 7 April 1963. The race started in Compiègne and finished in Roubaix. The race was won by Emile Daems of the Peugeot team.

General classification

References

Paris–Roubaix
Paris-Roubaix
Paris-Roubaix
Paris-Roubaix
Paris-Roubaix